The Battle of Stainmore was probably fought between the Earldom of Bernicia, led by Osulf, and the forces of the last Norse king of Jórvík (York), Eric Bloodaxe. According to Frank Stenton, the battle resulted in Eric being slain by Maccus, the son of Olaf, the dissolution of the Kingdom of Jórvík under King Edred of England and the integration of its territories into those of Bamburgh as the Earldom of Northumbria.

References

Battles involving Northumbria
Battles involving the Vikings
Westmorland
950s conflicts
954
10th century in England